Andy Thorn may refer to:
Andy Thorn (American football) (born 1982), American football player
Andy Thorn (footballer) (born 1966), English footballer